Route 705, or Highway 705, may refer to:

Canada
 New Brunswick Route 705
 Saskatchewan Highway 705

Costa Rica
 National Route 705

India
 National Highway 705

United Kingdom
 A705 road (Great Britain)

United States
 Interstate 705
 Florida State Road 705
 Georgia State Route 705 (former)
 Kentucky Route 705
 Louisiana Highway 705
 Maryland Route 705
 Nevada State Route 705
 County Route 705 (Camden County, New Jersey)
 County Route 705 (Cumberland County, New Jersey)
 County Route 705 (Gloucester County, New Jersey)
 County Route 705 (Hudson County, New Jersey)
 County Route 705 (Passaic County, New Jersey)
 North Carolina Highway 705
 Ohio State Route 705
 Farm to Market Road 705
 Virginia State Route 705
 West Virginia Route 705

Territories
 Puerto Rico Highway 705